Greifensteinite is beryllium phosphate mineral with formula: Ca2Fe2+5Be4(PO4)6(OH)4·6H2O. It is the Fe2+ dominant member of the roscherite group. It crystallizes in the monoclinic crystal system and typically forms prismatic dark olive green crystals.

It was first described in Germany at Greifenstein Rocks, Ehrenfriedersdorf, and was named for the location. At the type locality, it occurs within a lithium-rich pegmatite in miarolitic cavities. It was approved by the International Mineralogical Association in 2002.

References

Rastsvetaeva R K, Gurbanova O A, Chukanov N V (2006) Crystal structure of greifensteinite Ca2Fe2+☐Mg2Fe2+2Be4(PO4)6(OH)4·6H2O. Doklady Chemistry 41, 18-25 

Phosphate minerals
Beryllium minerals
Calcium minerals
Monoclinic minerals
Minerals in space group 15